The 1913 Sewanee Tigers football team represented Sewanee: The University of the South during the 1913 Southern Intercollegiate Athletic Association football season.

Schedule

References

Sewanee
Sewanee Tigers football seasons
Sewanee Tigers football